Richard Haughton (born 8 November 1980) is an English former rugby union player who currently works as a rugby referee.

He was educated at St John's School, Leatherhead.
He played on the wing or at fullback for Perpignan in the Top 14, and was a member of England Saxons and England Sevens squads. He also played for London Wasps and Saracens.
Haughton joined Perpignan in 2012, prior to which he played for Jersey for 2 months.

Haughton currently works as a rugby sevens referee on the World Rugby Sevens Series.

References

External links
 

1980 births
Living people
Black British sportspeople
Commonwealth Games medallists in rugby sevens
Commonwealth Games rugby sevens players of England
Commonwealth Games silver medallists for England
England international rugby sevens players
English rugby union players
Jersey Reds players
Male rugby sevens players
People educated at St John's School, Leatherhead
Rugby sevens players at the 2006 Commonwealth Games
Rugby union players from Luton
Saracens F.C. players
Wasps RFC players
Medallists at the 2006 Commonwealth Games